Zdravko Zupan (7 February 1950 – 9 October 2015) was a Yugoslav comic book creator and historian.

He is best known for comics such as "Tom & Jerry", "Zuzuko", "Munja", "Mickey Mouse", "Goofy" and "Ellsworth". Zupan is considered the most important historian of Serbian and Yugoslav comics. He lived in Belgrade.

Bibliography

Comics
 "Zuzuko", written by Z. Zupan et al., Yu strip, Munja, Bijela pčela etc., Serbia and Croatia, 1973-
 "Tom & Jerry", written by Lazar Odanović and Z. Zupan, VPA, Croatia, 1983–1988.
 "Mickey Mouse", written by François Corteggiani, Le Journal de Mickey, France, 1990–1994.
 "Goofy", written by F. Corteggiani, Le Journal de Mickey, France, 1990–1994.
 "Ellsworth", written by F. Corteggiani, Le Journal de Mickey, France, 1990–1994.
 "Miki i Baš-Čelik", written by Nikola Maslovara, Mikijev zabavnik, Serbia, 1999.
 "Munja", written by Z. Zupan, Vasa Pavković and Zoran Stefanović, Munja, Munja Strip and Bijela pčela, Serbia and Croatia, 2001-

History of comics 
 Istorija jugoslovenskog stripa I, Slavko Draginčić and Zdravko Zupan, Novi Sad, 1986.
 Vek stripa u Srbiji, Zdravko Zupan, Pančevo, 2007. 
 Veljko Kockar - strip, život, smrt, Zdravko Zupan (ed.), Pančevo, 2010. 
 The Comics We Loved, Selection of 20th Century Comics and Creators from the Region of Former Yugoslavia (Stripovi koje smo voleli: izbor stripova i stvaralaca sa prostora bivše Jugoslavije u XX veku), Živojin Tamburić, Zdravko Zupan and Zoran Stefanović, foreword by Paul Gravett, Belgrade, 2011. 
 Zigomar - maskirani pravednik by Branko Vidić, Nikola Navojev and Dragan Savić; editor and writer of the foreword: Zdravko Zupan, Pančevo, 2011. 
 Uragan, by Aleksije Ranhner and Svetislav B. Lazić, editor and writer of the foreword: Zdravko Zupan, Pančevo, 2012.

References

External links 

 Zdravko Zupan on Lambiek Comiclopedia 
 Zdravko Zupan, I.N.D.U.C.K.S. World-wide database about Disney comics 
 Paul Gravett. "Comics Culture in Yugoslavia: World-Class Innovators & Remarkable Visionaries", foreword for Tamburić-Zupan-Stefanović lexicon The Comics We Loved: Selection of 20th Century Comics and Creators from the Region of Former Yugoslavia, 2011. 
 Zupan, Zdravko. The Golden Age of Serbian Comics (Belgrade Comic Art 1935-1941), "Projekat Rastko". 
 Slobodan Ivkov. 60 godina stripa u Srbiji: Zdravko Zupan, leksikon, Subotica, 1995. E-izdanje: "Projekat Rastko" (Serbian)
 Magazin "Munja" (Serbian)
 Zdravko Zupan i Slavko Draginčić. Istorija jugoslovenskog stripa 1, Novi Sad 1986, kompletno elektronsko izdanje, "Projekat Rastko". (Serbian)
 Zdravko Zupan. Strip u Srbiji 1955-1972, "Projekat Rastko" (Serbian)

Writers from Zagreb
Serbian comics artists
Serbian comics writers
Disney comics artists
Comics critics
Comic book publishers (people)
1950 births
2015 deaths